Dave Thorson is an American basketball athlete and coach.

Thorson played varsity basketball for the Fargo South, Bruins, helping the team to its first state tournament berth in 17 years. He was a two-time All-Conference player for two seasons and played in the Lions All-Star game. The school inducted Thorson into its Hall of Fame in 2015.

Thorson played college ball at Hamline University in St. Paul, Minnesota. He spent one year in 1989 as a South Dakota graduate assistant. He moved to the University of Minnesota, serving as a volunteer assistant for two years before being promoted.

DeLaSalle High School (Minneapolis, MN) hired Thorson as a Social Studies teacher and boys’  basketball coach in 1994. Three years later, in 1997, he became the school's Director of Student Activities. In 2004, he became vice president for Development.

Over 23 seasons as DeLaSalle's head boys’ basketball coach, Thorson has won nine state titles (a state record among boys’ or girls’ coaches), while earning 15 appearances in the state tournament and compiling a career record of 527–136. Under Thorson's tenure, DeLaSalle won six straight Class AAA championships (2012–17), another Minnesota high school record for most consecutive state titles. Thorson also coached the Islanders to championships in 1998, 1999, and 2006.

Thorson was hired in April 2018 as an assistant coach to Niko Medved at Colorado State University. He held a similar role when Medved was the head coach for Drake University's men's basketball program for the 2017–18 season. Together, the two coached the Bulldogs to their first winning mark in Missouri Valley Conference play in 10 years, posting a 17-17 overall season record (10-8 in the Conference).

Thorson was hired in April 2021 as an assistant coach to Ben Johnson at the University of Minnesota. Ben Johnson played for Thorson when he was a student at DeLaSalle.

Thorson is married and has one daughter.

References

American men's basketball coaches
Drake Bulldogs men's basketball coaches
High school basketball coaches in the United States
Living people
Year of birth missing (living people)